First Cymru is an operator of bus services in South West Wales. It is a subsidiary of FirstGroup with its headquarters in Swansea.

History

In 1987, South Wales Transport was sold during the privatisation of the National Bus Company in a management buy out.

In February 1990, along with Brewers Motor Services and United Welsh Coaches, South Wales Transport was sold to Badgerline. All initially retained their trading names but following Badgerline merging with GRT Group in April 1995 to form FirstBus, all Welsh operations were rebranded as First Cymru.

Operations
The company operates around 200 bus services in the south Wales area, in and between Haverfordwest, Pembroke, Tenby, Carmarthen, Ammanford, Llanelli, Swansea, Pontardawe, Neath, Port Talbot, Maesteg, Bridgend and Cardiff.

The company operates a bus rapid transit route in Swansea, branded Metro and a frequent shuttle service from Swansea to Cardiff branded X10.

In addition to internal South Wales work, First Cymru also runs up to Mid and West Wales on the TrawsCymru T1 and T1S services.

Campus To Campus 
For students of Swansea University, Campus to Campus service 8 links the Hendrefoelan Student Village, Singleton Park Campus and Bay Campus, plus Fabian Way Park and Ride to Swansea City Centre. Campus to Campus service 9 is a shuttle bus between Singleton Park Campus and Bay Campus. Campus to Campus service 10 links Singleton Park Campus and Bay Campus with student areas Uplands and Sketty. These replaced the 82a and 85 in 2015 to coincide with the opening of the Bay Campus.

Park and Ride 
First Cymru operates park & ride sites, which are located at Fabian Way and Landore in Swansea. They also operate a summer park & ride in Tenby.

X10
First Cymru operate an hourly shuttle service between Cardiff, Bridgend Designer Outlet and Swansea called the X10. This replaced a Greyhound UK service in December 2015.

Cymru Clipper
In 2014, First Cymru started the Cymru Clipper express network which spans from Carmarthen & Ammanford to Cardiff.

Services X1, X2, X3, X5, X6, X7, X8, X11, X13, are encompassed into this network. Dedicated vehicles operate these services, with the majority of them offering WiFi and leather seats as standard.

Swansea Metro
First Cymru operate a bus rapid transport route between Singleton Hospital, Swansea University, Swansea City Centre and Morriston Hospital as Swansea Metro. On 28 August 2015 the fleet of Wright StreetCar articulated buses that operated the service were replaced by Wright StreetLite buses and were rebranded to red metro branding.

Cymru Coaster
In May 2021, First Cymru launched two new open top bus routes in Swansea and Porthcawl:
1 Swansea (Bus Station) to Bracelet Bay via Mumbles
99 Trecco Bay to Rest Bay via  Porthcawl Town Centre

A further two open-top coaster services were launched in June 2022:
Aberavon Coaster Port Talbot Bus Station to Aberavon Seafront 
Tenby Coaster Tenby to Saundersfoot

National Express
Until July 2012 First Cymru were a National Express contractor and operated services on routes:
 201 Swansea - Gatwick Airport
 202 Swansea - Heathrow Airport
 508 Haverfordwest - London Victoria Coach Station
 528 Haverfordwest - Rochdale

Fleet
As at March 2014 the fleet consisted of 387 buses and coaches.

Depots
First Cymru operate depots in Bridgend, Haverfordwest, Port Talbot, Tycroes , and Swansea.

See also
 Transport in Wales
 List of bus operators of the United Kingdom
 Bus transport in Cardiff

References

External links
 Company website

Bus operators in Wales
Bus transport in Cardiff
Companies based in Swansea
FirstGroup companies
Transport in Bridgend County Borough
Transport in Cardiff
Transport in Carmarthenshire
Transport in Pembrokeshire
Transport in Neath Port Talbot
Transport in Swansea